Avalon Worship, originally known as Avalon, is an American contemporary Christian vocal quartet from Nashville, Tennessee, formed in 1995. The group has earned multiple RIAA-certified gold records. The group currently consists of Janna Long, Greg Long, Jody McBrayer, and Dani Rocca.

Group history

1995–97: Formation, debut, and A Maze of Grace 
Avalon was formed in 1995 in Nashville after Norman Miller of Proper Management took the idea of a vocal group to Grant Cunningham, A&R Director at Sparrow Records. Miller's vision was to have two male and two female vocalists who could sing tight harmonies and carry the Gospel to the world. Cunningham publicized his intentions and received many demo tapes, but nothing fit his desires. After letting the idea of Avalon rest a while, Cunningham attended an artist showcase in Nashville to listen to a singer. However, another artist, Michael Passons, caught his attention, and Passons was the first of the group's founding members. Soon after, former Truth vocalist and South Carolina native Janna Potter (later Janna Long) heard about Avalon's formation.

Rikk Kittlemann and Tabitha Fair became part of the group, but each left after a short time. Fair was offered a solo record deal, and Kittlemann left for other opportunities. With two member openings, Long contacted her former Truth bandmate Jody McBrayer, who became a member of Avalon a few days later. Nikki Hassman-Anders was the fourth founding vocalist of Avalon. Hassman recorded two albums with Avalon, Avalon (1996) and A Maze of Grace (1997), before leaving in May 1998 to pursue a solo career with Sony Records.

1998–02: In a Different Light, Joy, Oxygen, and solo projects 
Cherie Paliotta (later Cherie Adams) replaced Hassman after one of Avalon's co-managers listened to a country music demo tape recorded by Adams. Though country is not a genre Avalon performs in, executives chose Adams as they believed she would be a perfect fit. Adams recorded four albums with Avalon: In a Different Light (1999), Joy: A Christmas Collection (2000), Oxygen (2001), and a remix album, O2: Avalon Remixed (March 2002). In 1999, it won the Concert Artists Guild Competition.

Adams departed the group to pursue a solo ministry geared toward single women, and in September 2002, she was replaced by Melissa Greene, another of Long's former bandmates in Truth. In between projects Jody McBrayer released a solo album, This Is Who I Am, in September 2002. The album included the Top Ten hit "Never Alone (Nunca Solo)" a duet with Jadyn Maria, as well as a number-one single, "To Ever Live Without Me." Janna also released a self-titled solo album in October which contained the number-two song "Greater Is He".

2003–06: Testify to Love, The Creed, Stand, and Faith 
On March 25, 2003, Avalon released a greatest hits record, Testify to Love: The Very Best of Avalon, which featured two new singles that became No. 1 hits; "Everything to Me" and "New Day". It was the last album to include founding member Michael Passons; only months after the album's release the member known as 'Father Avalon' was dismissed by the group in summer 2003.

After eight years with Avalon, Passons revealed in an interview in 2020 that he was forced out of the group due to his sexual orientation as a gay man and his refusal to continue attending reparative therapy. "Avalon showed up at my house and told me I was no longer in the group ... And it was all because of who I am. ... I'm a gay man and I'm glad to be." Passons was replaced by Janna Long's husband, Greg.

On February 24, 2004, Avalon released the studio album The Creed. Three singles were released: lead single "All", which made it to No. 2 on the Adult Contemporary Christian Songs chart; "You Were There"," a No. 2 Inspirational Charts hit, and "I Wanna Be With You", featuring Greg Long as the lead singer. Avalon's sixth studio album, Stand, was released on January 24, 2006. Lead single "Love Won't Leave You" peaked in the Top 20 of both Billboard Hot Christian Songs and Hot Christian Adult Contemporary charts. The next single, "Orphans of God", was serviced to radio on April 7, 2006, and peaked in the Top 5 of Radio & Records' Inspo chart the week of August 11, 2006. Additionally, "Somehow You Are" was released to radio in August 2006. On October 17, 2006, Avalon released a fan-requested hymns album, titled Faith: A Hymns Collection.

2007–09: Another Time, Another Place, The Greatest Hits, and Reborn 
In mid-2007, Jody McBrayer decided to depart the group due to a heart condition. But, before he left, he found time to record one last album with Avalon. On February 26, 2008, Avalon released their ninth album, Another Time, Another Place: Timeless Christian Classics. A headlining tour, titled "The We Will Stand Tour," followed in spring 2008 to promote the album; the band was accompanied by Michael English, the Daniel Doss Band, and Cadia. The first single released from Another Time, Another Place was their cover of the Twila Paris song "God Is in Control." The second single, released on November 5, 2007, was a remake of the Sandi Patty/Wayne Watson song "Another Time, Another Place," featuring a Jody/Janna duet. On November 13, 2007, Avalon released Another Time, Another Place EP, a digital EP featuring three songs from the album: singles "God is in Control" and "Another Time, Another Place," and a cover of the Amy Grant song "Thy Word."

Jeremi Richardson joined the group in late 2007 to replace Jody McBrayer. Richardson, Greene, and Janna Long had attended the same college, Lee University in Cleveland, Tennessee. Richardson had sung with the group Voices of Liberty at Walt Disney World, and was recommended to Janna Long and Greene through mutual acquaintances. On November 11, 2007, Melissa Greene announced at a show in Spring Arbor, Michigan, that it was the first concert with Richardson officially being a member of the group.

It was confirmed in late 2008 that EMI CMG would release Avalon: The Greatest Hits, a compilation of successful hits from previous Avalon recordings. It is notable that the track list, as published by the record label, bears many of the same hits featured on the 2003 release Testify to Love: The Very Best of Avalon (11 of the 16 songs featured on the older hits record also made the cut for the new one). The album does, however, contain four radio successes from three of Avalon's projects that have been released since the last hits record: "All" and "You Were There" from The Creed (2004), "Orphans of God" from Stand (2006), and "In Christ Alone" from Faith: A Hymns Collection (2006).  In addition, the album features a new song from Avalon titled "Still My God." On March 31, 2009, "Still My God" became Avalon's first No. 1 single since "New Day" released in 2003, from Avalon's previous greatest hits album.

On May 15, 2009, Melissa Greene announced her resignation from Avalon on her personal website upon accepting a position as Pastor of Music and Arts at GracePointe Church in Nashville. Greene said she planned to continue her solo career as well. On May 21, 2009, Avalon announced that Richardson's wife, Amy, would fill Greene's spot as the newest member of Avalon. Janna went on maternity leave from Avalon beginning February 9, 2010, after giving birth to her daughter Eleanor Hovland. Shortly after the release of the recent hits record, Avalon announced they would be returning to the studio to record a new studio album (their first since Stand in 2006) on E1 Music, thus ending their long-time stint on Sparrow Records. Avalon began recording vocals for the new album on May 19, 2009. It was announced in June 2009 that the album would be titled Reborn. The first single, "Arise," was released to Christian radio in August 2009; on December 9, it officially became Avalon's 22nd career No. 1 radio hit, topping Billboard's Soft AC/Inspirational chart. This came just weeks after the group wrapped up their co-headlining tour with fellow Christian group Selah in late 2009.

2018–present: Called 
On August 7, 2018, after a decade as members of Avalon, Jeremi and Amy Richardson stopped touring. Avalon announced in their Facebook page the return of Jody McBrayer and the addition of new member, Dani Rocca. On October 24, 2018, Avalon announced that they had signed as the flagship artist with Red Street Records, a new label launched by Rascal Flatts bassist Jay DeMarcus. On November 1, 2018, they sang their debut concert as Avalon in Jacksonville, Florida on the opening night of the Greatest Hits Tour, organized by Newsong.

Avalon released "Keeper of My Heart" on December 7, 2019, 10 years after Avalon's previous radio single.  It was followed by a new album, Called, on February 14, 2020 and tour.

In 2022, the group rebranded under the name Avalon Worship and have released their self-titled album under this moniker.

Members

Current members 
 Janna (Potter) Long (1995–present)
 Greg Long (2003–present)
 Jody McBrayer (1995–2007, 2018–present)
 Dani Rocca (2018–present)

Former members 
 Rikk Kittlemann (1995)
 Tabitha Fair (1995–1996)
 Nikki Hassman-Anders (1996–1998)
 Cherie (Paliotta) Adams (1998–2002)
 Michael Passons (1995–2003)
 Melissa Greene (2002–2009)
 Jeremi Richardson (2007–2018)
 Amy McBride-Richardson (2009–2018)

Timeline

Discography

Studio albums

Christmas albums

Compilation albums

Singles

Live albums

Music videos 
 2000: "In Not Of" music video
 2006: "In Christ Alone" music video; featured in Tribute to Ruth Graham
 2019: "Keeper of My Heart" music video

Awards and nominations

References

External links

1996 establishments in Tennessee
American Christian musical groups
Musical groups established in 1996
Musical groups from Nashville, Tennessee
Sparrow Records artists